Kean Shay Bryan (born 1 November 1996) is an English professional footballer who plays for EFL Championship club West Bromwich Albion.

Career

Manchester City
Bryan began his career at Manchester City at the age of 11, and went on to captain the club's development squad, where he was converted from a box-to-box midfielder into a centre-back.

After aborting an agreed loan to Dutch Eredivisie club NAC Breda, on 31 August 2016, he joined League One side Bury on loan for the rest of the 2016–17 season. He made his debut in the English Football League on 3 September, coming on as a 71st-minute substitute for Niall Maher in a 4–1 win over Port Vale at Gigg Lane. On 15 October he was sent off in a 2–0 loss at rivals Rochdale for a high tackle on Andy Cannon, prompting a mêlée of all 22 players.

On 31 August 2017, Bryan was loaned to Oldham Athletic until January 2018. On 16 January 2018, He returned to the club on loan for the rest of the season. On 17 May 2018, Bryan won the Oldham Athletic Young Player Of The Season award at the club's annual awards ceremony.

Sheffield United
On 2 August 2018, Bryan joined Sheffield United on a free transfer, signing a three-year contract. The deal included a sell-on clause. Bryan signed for League One club Bolton Wanderers on a six-month loan on 30 January 2020. He played six times as they suffered relegation, and scored a late equaliser in a 2–1 loss at Blackpool on 25 February.

On 28 November 2020, Bryan made his Premier League debut in a 1–0 away defeat against West Bromwich Albion.  On 27 January 2021, he scored his first Premier League goal in a 2–1 away win over Manchester United.

West Bromwich Albion 

On 7 September 2021, Bryan signed for West Bromwich Albion on a two-year deal following his release from Sheffield United in the summer. After sustaining a cruciate ligament injury in a 1-0 win against Hull City on November 3 2021, Bryan was ruled out for the rest of the season.

Style of play
Able to operate as a centre-back or box-to-box midfield, Bryan has been praised for his vision and passing ability, as well as for his long-range shots and penalty-taking.

Personal life
Bryan has been in a relationship with actress Brooke Vincent since 2016. They have two sons, born in October 2019 and May 2021. His mother died in June 2020.

Honours
Oldham Athletic Young Player Of The Season award 2017–18

Statistics

Notes

References

External links
England profile at The FA

1996 births
Living people
Footballers from Manchester
English footballers
England youth international footballers
Association football defenders
Association football midfielders
Manchester City F.C. players
Bury F.C. players
Oldham Athletic A.F.C. players
Sheffield United F.C. players
Bolton Wanderers F.C. players
West Bromwich Albion F.C. players
English Football League players
Premier League players
English people of Jamaican descent